Bhavan's Tripura College of Science and Technology, established in 2003, is a general degree college in Agartala, Tripura. It offers undergraduate courses in sciences. It is affiliated to  Tripura University. 
The college is recognized by the University Grants Commission (UGC).

See also
Education in India
Education in Tripura
Tripura University
Swami Vivekananda
Literacy in India
List of institutions of higher education in Tripura

References

External links
http://www.btcstagartala.org/

Colleges affiliated to Tripura University
Educational institutions established in 2003
Universities and colleges in Tripura
2003 establishments in Tripura
Colleges in Tripura